Crn Kamen ( Guri i Zi in Albanian) is a mountain found in Kosovo in the Šar Mountains in Gora next to North Macedonia and Albania.

The nearest peaks are Murga and Popova Sapka. The nearest town is Brod, and the nearest lake is Šutmansko Lake. It is one of the higher peaks in Kosovo.

Notes and references
Notes

References

Mountains of Kosovo
Šar Mountains
Two-thousanders of Kosovo